Rowdy Baby is a Tamil language song composed by Yuvan Shankar Raja for the soundtrack of the 2018 action comedy film Maari 2 and sung by Dhanush alongside Dhee. The song was officially released on 28 November 2018 as a single from the film.

Upon release, the song went viral and became very popular, and its music video, released in January 2019, featuring the film's lead pair Dhanush and Sai Pallavi, broke several YouTube records, becoming one of the most viewed Indian songs of all-time. Billboard listed the song in the Global Top 10 Music Videos of 2019. According to YouTube Top Trending Music Videos, Rowdy Baby was the most streamed Indian video of 2019 and the seventh most globally. As of 16 November 2020, the views on YouTube crossed 1 billion views, making it the only South Indian (and Tamil) cinema song on YouTube to achieve this feat, also the lyrical video of the song has garnered more than 93 million views on YouTube. This is the 20th most-viewed Indian video on YouTube.

Music video
The video see the film's lead pair, Dhanush and Sai Pallavi dancing to the tune in a set at the AVM studios in Chennai. Prabhu Deva was assigned to choreograph the song  along with Jani Master. Sai Pallavi, who had participated in a dance reality TV show called Ungalil Yaar Adutha Prabhudeva 10 years before and was eliminated in the semi-finals, failing to meet him, later recalled that through this song, she was eventually able to meet and work with Prabhu Deva, sharing a picture taken on the sets, which coincidentally was the same sets where the show had been shot before. The video was uploaded on 12 January 2019 on YouTube, and had achieved lot of views due to its choreography and picturisation.

Reception

Critical response 
"Rowdy Baby" was listed as one of the year's best Tamil songs by musicaloud.com, and in the Top 10 Tamil songs of November on Film Companion by Karthik Srinivasan, who called it a "fantastic song, with a swinging African-style guitar and funky singing by Dhanush and Dhee". Aarthi Murali of Silverscreen stated the song to be "cheeky, stupid, and of the best kind".

Performance and records
The music video became a viral phenomenon upon release, breaking several YouTube records. Besides being the second fastest South Indian as well as Tamil language video to reach 100 million views in 17 days (Arabic Kuthu being the first in 12 days), it was also the first to cross 200 million views. On 8 February 2019, it crossed 179 million views, beating Dhanush's previous viral hit "Why This Kolaveri Di" to become the most viewed Tamil song, before beating " In August 2019, it was said to be the "first Tamil song to cross 500 million views". On 16 November 2020, it crossed 1 billion views to become the first Tamil film song to achieve this feat.

It was one of the two most streamed songs on JioSaavn.

Awards and nominations

References

External links
Rowdy Baby (video song) on YouTube
Rowdy Baby (lyric video) on YouTube

2018 songs
Indian songs
Tamil-language songs
Tamil film songs
Songs written for films
Songs written by Dhanush
Songs with music by Yuvan Shankar Raja